The Navarangahala ("New Theatre"), in Colombo, is one of the main national theatres of Sri Lanka.

History
Built between 1966 and 1969 by the 4 Field Engineer Regiment, SLE as the Royal Primary School Hall, it was specially designed for local drama and music which required open air type auditorium in accordance to Natya Shastra. Funding for the construction and equipment came from the government and donations. Until it was built there were no purpose-built indoor theatres for the local arts, apart from the few open air amphitheatres. The foundation stone for the theatre was laid by the Minister for Education, I. M. R. A. Iriyagolla, on 11 November 1966 and it was officially opened by the Prime Minister Dudley Senanayake on 1 August 1969.

Following the amalgamation of Royal Preparatory School with Royal College in December 1977, Navarangahala became part of Royal College.

Notable events
On 22 May 1972 the House of Representatives of Ceylon met at the Navarangahala to finalise and approve the Republic Constitution, which proclaimed establishment of the Republic of Sri Lanka.

References

Theatres in Colombo District
Legislative buildings in Sri Lanka
Cultural buildings in Colombo
Royal College, Colombo
Tourist attractions in Colombo